Te Koura was flag station on the North Island Main Trunk line, in the Ruapehu District of New Zealand in the Ōngarue valley. When opened in 1903 it had sidings, a platform and a goods shed, The line was useable from February 1903 and goods traffic started on 22 June 1903.

The station served a small settlement, which existed before the railway came and where about a mile of riverside terrace was cultivated. In 2013 meshblock 1030000, which includes Te Koura, had a population of 51 in 27 houses. Nearby Te Koura Marae has a memorial to victims of the 1918 flu epidemic.

The junction opened in 1933 at Okahukura,  to the south. In 1912 it was referred to as Te Koura Railway.

In 1964 the station had 3 railway houses alongside, but by 1972 only one was left.

References 

Railway stations in New Zealand
Ruapehu District
Rail transport in Manawatū-Whanganui
Buildings and structures in Manawatū-Whanganui
Railway stations opened in 1903
Railway stations closed in 1971